If Tomorrow Comes may refer to:

 If Tomorrow Comes (film), a 1971 American TV film
 If Tomorrow Comes (novel), a 1985 novel by Sidney Sheldon
 If Tomorrow Comes (miniseries), a 1986 miniseries based on the novel
 If Tomorrow Comes (TV series), a 2011–2012 South Korean series
 If Tomorrow Comes..., a 2009 album by Maino